Osage is a village in the Canadian province of Saskatchewan within the Rural Municipality of Fillmore No. 96 and Census Division No. 2. The village is located on Highway 33, that runs south-east from Regina to Stoughton. The village has a grain elevator, post office, service station, and a two-sheet natural ice curling rink. Children from the area attend school in Fillmore, 13 km away. Osage celebrated its centennial in 2006.

Osage Wildlife Refuge is about 3 miles south-east of the village.

History 
Osage incorporated as a village on May 8, 1906.

Demographics 

See also

List of communities in Saskatchewan
Villages of Saskatchewan

References

Villages in Saskatchewan
Fillmore No. 96, Saskatchewan
Division No. 2, Saskatchewan